The 1985 Stanford Cardinal football team represented Stanford University in the Pacific-10 Conference (Pac-10) during the 1985 NCAA Division I-A football season. In their second season under head coach Jack Elway, the Cardinal compiled a 4–7 record (3–5 in Pac-10, tied for seventh), and played home games on campus at Stanford Stadium in Stanford, California.

Schedule

Roster

References

Stanford
Stanford Cardinal football seasons
Stanford Cardinal football